Ro-14, originally named Submarine No. 22, was an Imperial Japanese Navy Kaichū-Type submarine of the Kaichū II subclass. She was commissioned in 1921 and operated in the waters of Japan. She was stricken in 1933.

Design and description
The submarines of the Kaichu II sub-class were larger and had a greater range than the preceding Kaichu I subclass, but they had the same power-plant, so their greater size resulted in a loss of some speed. They also had a modified conning tower, bow, and stern, and the stern was overhanging. They displaced  surfaced and  submerged.

For surface running, the submarines were powered by two  Sulzer Mark II diesel engines, each driving one propeller shaft. When submerged each propeller was driven by a  electric motor. They could reach  on the surface and  underwater.

The submarines were armed with six  torpedo tubes, four internal tubes in the bow and two external tubes mounted on the upper deck, and carried a total of ten Type 44 torpedoes. They were also armed with a single  deck gun mounted aft of the conning tower.

Construction and commissioning

Ro-14 was laid down as Submarine No. 22 on 14 September 1918 by the Kure Naval Arsenal at Kure, Japan. Launched on 31 March 1919, she was completed and commissioned on 17 February 1921.

Service history

Upon commissioning, Submarine No. 22 was attached to the Kure Naval District — to which she remained attached throughout her career — and was assigned to Submarine Division 13 and to the Kure Defense Division. On 1 July 1921, she was reassigned to Submarine Division 15, remaining on duty in the Kure Defense Division. Submarine Division 15 served in the Kure Defense Division until 1 December 1921 and again from 1 December 1922 to 1 December 1923. 

On 8 April 1924, Submarine No. 22 was conducting torpedo practice off Hiroshima, Japan, when mishandling of one of her torpedo tubes caused a torpedo to fire backward into the torpedo compartment, killing one crewman. She headed back to base, and either later the same day or on 9 April (sources disagree) collided with the Imperial Japanese Navy special service vessel , suffering no additional casualties but incurring damage so serious that she was in danger of sinking. However, she made port, was repaired, and returned to service.

Submarine No. 22 was renamed Ro-14 on 1 November 1924. On 1 December 1926, Submarine Division 15 began another assignment to the Kure Defense Division that lasted through the end of Ro-14′s active service.

Ro-14 was stricken from the Navy list on 1 September 1933. She remained moored at Kure as a hulk after that, and was renamed Training Hulk No. 3063 on 7 March 1934. She served on training duties through the end of World War II in August 1945, and was scrapped at Harima, Japan, in September 1948.

Notes

References
, History of Pacific War Vol.17 I-Gō Submarines, Gakken (Japan), January 1998, 
Rekishi Gunzō, History of Pacific War Extra, "Perfect guide, The submarines of the Imperial Japanese Forces", Gakken (Japan), March 2005, 
The Maru Special, Japanese Naval Vessels No.43 Japanese Submarines III, Ushio Shobō (Japan), September 1980, Book code 68343-44
The Maru Special, Japanese Naval Vessels No.132 Japanese Submarines I "Revised edition", Ushio Shobō (Japan), February 1988, Book code 68344-36
The Maru Special, Japanese Naval Vessels No.133 Japanese Submarines II "Revised edition", Ushio Shobō (Japan), March 1988, Book code 68344-37
The Maru Special, Japanese Naval Vessels No.135 Japanese Submarines IV, Ushio Shobō (Japan), May 1988, Book code 68344-39

Ro-13-class submarines
Kaichū type submarines
Ships built by Kure Naval Arsenal
1919 ships
Japanese submarine accidents
Maritime incidents in 1924